Commercial Bank of Africa (Tanzania) (CBAT) is a commercial bank in Tanzania. It is licensed by the Bank of Tanzania, the country's central bank and national banking regulator. The bank is a subsidiary of the Commercial Bank of Africa Group and has its headquarters in Nairobi, Kenya.

Location
The headquarters and main branch of CBA Tanzania Limited are located at Amani Place, along Ohio Street, in Dar es Salaam, Tanzania's largest city and financial capital. The geographical coordinates of the bank's headquarters are: 06°48'42.0"S, 39°17'15.0"E (Latitude:-6.811667; Longitude:39.287500).

Overview
CBAT serves the banking needs of individuals and businesses in Tanzania. The bank focuses on meeting the banking needs of large corporations, diplomatic missions, non-governmental organizations, and high-end private clients. , the bank's total assets were valued at TZS:462.2 billion (approximately US$204 million), with shareholders equity of TZS:43 billion (US$19 million).

History
The bank was founded in 1962 in Dar es Salaam. Branches were soon opened in Nairobi and Mombasa, Kenya and in Kampala, Uganda. When Tanzania nationalized private banks in 1967, the bank moved its headquarters to Nairobi. Following political changes in Uganda in 1971, the bank sold its assets in that country. In July 2005, the Commercial Bank of Africa (CBA) acquired majority shareholding in First American Bank of Kenya, which at the time had a Tanzanian subsidiary called United Bank of Africa. In 2007, United Bank of Africa rebranded to Commercial Bank of Africa (Tanzania), returning the brand to the country since 1967. In January 2014, CBA opened its first branch in Uganda.

Branch network
, CBAT maintained branches at the following locations:

 Ohio Street Branch: Amani Place, Ohio Street, Dar es Salaam Main Branch
 Kariakoo Branch: Tropical Hotel, Narung'ombe Street, Dar es Salaam
 Kijitonyama Branch: Tanzania Telecommunications Company Limited Building, Plot no 717, Block number 6, Kijitonyama, Dar es Salaam
 Samora Branch: PPF House, Corner of Samora Machel Avenue & Morogoro Road, Dar es Salaam
 Nyerere Branch: Jamana House, Julius K. Nyerere Road, Dar es Salaam
 Mtwara Branch: Tanu Road, Mtwara
 Moshi Branch: Tanzania Telecommunications Company Limited Building, Moshi
 Arusha Branch: TFA Building, Fire Road, Arusha
 Mbeya Branch: 41 Soweto Area, Block ‘O, Mbeya
 Tunduma Branch: Tanzania Telecommunications Company Limited Building , Plot no 56/2, Block I, Tunduma, Mbeya
 Mwanza Branch: Kenyatta Road, Mwanza.

See also

References

Banks of Tanzania
Companies of Tanzania
Economy of Dar es Salaam
Banks established in 1962
1962 establishments in Tanzania